The Bailey Collection is a collection of philatelic material relating to the Spanish Civil War that forms part of the British Library Philatelic Collections. The collection was donated to the Library by the Spanish Study Circle in 2007.

See also
Blackburn Collection
Postage stamps and postal history of Spain
Shelley Collection

References

Further reading 
Shelley, Ronald G. The postal history of the Spanish Civil War, 1936-1939. Brighton: R.G. Shelley, 1967.

External links
The Bailey Collection - British Library Philatelic Collections
Spanish Postal History Resources

British Library Philatelic Collections
Philately of Spain